Antsohihy is a city (commune urbaine) in northern Madagascar. It is the administrative capital of the Sofia Region.

Geography
Antsohihy is the capital of Sofia Region and of Antsohihy District. It is situated at the junction of Route nationale 6 and Route nationale 32.
Antsohihy is served by a local airport.

The town is crossed by the Loza River.

Nature
 The Bora Reserve is located near Ansohihy.

Education
The town hosts the annexes of the University Institute of Technology and Agronomy of Mahajanga (IUTAM), the University Institute of Management and Administration (IUGM) and the School of Law and Political Science (EDSP) of the University of Mahajanga.

References

Cities in Madagascar
Populated places in Sofia Region
Regional capitals in Madagascar